"Happiness in Slavery" is a song by American industrial rock band Nine Inch Nails from their extended play, Broken (1992). It was released in November 1992 as a promotional single from the EP. The song takes its title and refrain from Jean Paulhan's preface to Pauline Réage's 1954 erotic novel Story of O. "Happiness in Slavery" peaked at number 13 on the US Billboard Modern Rock Tracks chart.

Nine Inch Nails' performance of "Happiness in Slavery" at Woodstock '94, included on the concert's compilation album, won the Grammy Award for Best Metal Performance in 1996. The song's music video was almost universally banned for its depiction of Bob Flanagan being tortured by a machine.

Music video

The music video for "Happiness in Slavery", directed by Jon Reiss, was inspired by the 1899 novel The Torture Garden by French author Octave Mirbeau. It features performance artist Bob Flanagan entering a large room, placing a flower and a candle on an altar and in a ritualistic style prepares for something; by stripping naked and washing himself before becoming strapped into a machine with long robotic claws that arise from the machine and subsequently tear apart his skin and impale his hands. The man reacts with pleasure as this occurs. There are also drills that drill into his skin in various places letting his blood drip onto the floor beneath, where there is a garden apparently being fertilized by human blood.

Later in the video, large grinders emerge from the machine to cause extreme injury to the man's skin. As he continues to scream in a mixture of pleasure and pain, the machine begins to disembowel him, ultimately killing him. It then engulfs the man's body in a metal cask and minces it into fertilizer for the garden below. In the conclusion, Trent Reznor, who had been singing the lyrics inside a cell at the beginning of the video, enters the room and performs the same ritual that the previous man performed, but is unseen.

The video was almost universally banned once released, but was later included on the Closure video album and in the Broken film. It was featured on Too Much 4 Much, MuchMusic's showcase of videos banned from their regular programming.

Reznor commented that the video was not created for shock value, but because "these were the most appropriate visuals for the song." It had to do with his artistic freedom at the time after his fallout with TVT Records.

Track listings
US promotional CD single 
"Happiness in Slavery" (LP version) – 5:26

US promotional CD single 
"Happiness in Slavery" (Flaccid edit) – 4:17
"Happiness in Slavery" (LP version) – 5:26

'US promotional 12" single

A1. "Happiness in Slavery" (Fixed version) – 6:09
A2. "Happiness in Slavery" (Sherwood Slave Mix) – 2:17
B1. "Happiness in Slavery" (PK Slavery Remix) – 5:41
B2. "Happiness in Slavery" (Broken version) – 5:21

Charts

In popular culture
The track was sampled for "Centipede" by Canadian extreme metal band Strapping Young Lad, appearing on their 1997 live album No Sleep 'till Bedtime.

A brief snippet of a version of "Happiness in Slavery" plays during the final scene of the 1996 film Irma Vep.

A remix of the song was also played in the 2003 short film Saw.''

References

1992 songs
Black-and-white music videos
Grammy Award for Best Metal Performance
Nine Inch Nails songs
Song recordings produced by Trent Reznor
Songs about BDSM
Songs written by Trent Reznor
Industrial metal songs
Music video controversies